Mladenka Malenica (born 26 May 1972 in Split) is a Croatian sport shooter. She competed in rifle shooting events at the Summer Olympics in 1988, 1996, and 2000.

Olympic results

References

1972 births
Living people
ISSF rifle shooters
Croatian female sport shooters
Olympic shooters of Croatia
Shooters at the 1988 Summer Olympics
Shooters at the 1996 Summer Olympics
Shooters at the 2000 Summer Olympics